35th Street may refer to:

35th Street (Manhattan), New York City
35th Street Bridge, Charleston, West Virginia